Boztepe Dam is a dam in Malatya Province, Turkey, built between 1994 and 2002. The development was backed by the Turkish State Hydraulic Works.

See also
List of dams and reservoirs in Turkey

References
DSI directory, State Hydraulic Works (Turkey), Retrieved December 16, 2009

Dams in Malatya Province

fr:Barrage de Boztepe (Tokat)
tr:Boztepe Barajı, Tokat